The Porter Motor Company was an early American steam automobile manufacturer based in Allston, Massachusetts.

Major Dane Porter (first name is Major) built the steam powered Porter Stanhope from 1900 to 1901 and advertised it as "The Only Perfect Automobile". Offices were located at 950 Tremont Building, Boston.

The Porter runabout featured an aluminium body and a weight of 550-lbs. It was capable of 25-mph, and was priced at $750, .

References

See also 
 VirtualSteamCarMuseum - Porter Motor Co.
 SteamCarNetwork - 1901 Porter Stanhope
Defunct motor vehicle manufacturers of the United States
Motor vehicle manufacturers based in Massachusetts
Vehicle manufacturing companies established in 1900
Vehicle manufacturing companies disestablished in 1901
History of Boston
Steam cars
Steam vehicles
Veteran vehicles
1900s cars
Cars introduced in 1900